Lyndon Dale is an unincorporated community located in the town of Fox Lake, Dodge County, Wisconsin, United States. The community is found on a peninsula in Fox Lake.

Notes

Unincorporated communities in Dodge County, Wisconsin
Unincorporated communities in Wisconsin